Mendiola Consortium (MC) is an educational organization of five institutions located along the street of Mendiola in Manila, Philippines. It was founded on July 16, 1974, upon the invitation of then Centro Escolar University President Dionisio Tiongco to the heads of San Beda University, College of the Holy Spirit and La Consolacion College Manila.

They agreed to unite their resources to enhance the capability of providing quality education and public service, and to participate more effectively in the attainment of national development. It is through the MC schools that Mendiola street have become a peace zone since it was traditionally a site of rallies because of its proximity to Malacañan Palace.

Member institutions
Centro Escolar University
College of the Holy Spirit
La Consolacion College Manila
San Beda University
Saint Jude Catholic School

External links
Official website

College and university associations and consortia in the Philippines
Education in Metro Manila
San Miguel, Manila